Matt Harvey (born 1989) is an American baseball pitcher.

Matt Harvey or Matthew Harvey may also refer to:

 Matthew Harvey (1781–1866), American lawyer, jurist and politician
 Matt Harvey (poet), English performance poet
 Matt T. Harvey, American journalist
 Matt Harvey, death metal guitarist and vocalist of Exhumed (band)
 Matt Harvey, a character in The Onedin Line, a British television serial
 Matt Harvey, a character in Teachers (UK TV series)